Heliconius ethilla, the ethilia longwing, is a butterfly of the family Nymphalidae. It was described by Jean-Baptiste Godart in 1819. It is found from Panama to southern Brazil. The habitat consists of marginal forests.

The wingspan is 60–70 mm. The forewings are orange with a black margin and four black spots. The hindwings are orange with two black stripes.

The larvae feed on Passiflora species. Full-grown larvae have a white body with an orange head and reach a length of about 17 mm.

Subspecies
H. e. ethilla (Venezuela, Trinidad)
H. e. adela Neustetter, 1912 (Peru)
H. e. aerotome C. & R. Felder, 1862 (Brazil: Amazonas)
H. e. cephallenia C. & R. Felder, [1865] (Surinam)
H. e. chapadensis Brown, 1973 (Brazil: Mato Grosso)
H. e. claudia Godman & Salvin, 1881 (Panama)
H. e. eucoma (Hübner, [1831]) (Peru to Panama)
H. e. flavofasciatus Weymer, 1894 (Brazil: Pará)
H. e. flavomaculatus Weymer, 1894 (Brazil: Pernambuco)
H. e. hyalina Neustetter, 1928 (Brazil: Roraima)
H. e. jaruensis Brown, 1976 (Brazil: Rondônia)
H. e. latona Neukirchen, 1998 (Colombia)
H. e. mentor Weymer, 1883 (Colombia)
H. e. metalilis Butler, 1873 (Venezuela)
H. e. michaelianius Lamas, 1988 (Peru)
H. e. narcaea Godart, 1819 (Brazil: Rio de Janeiro)
H. e. nebulosa Kaye, 1916 (Peru)
H. e. neukircheni Lamas, 1998 (Peru)
H. e. numismaticus Weymer, 1894 (Brazil: Pará)
H. e. penthesilea Neukirchen, 1994 (Brazil: Amazonas)
H. e. polychrous C. & R. Felder, [1865] (Brazil: São Paulo)
H. e. semiflavidus Weymer, 1894 (Colombia)
H. e. thielei Riffarth, 1900 (French Guiana)
H. e. tyndarus Weymer, 1897 (Bolivia)
H. e. yuruani Brown & Fernández, 1985 (Venezuela)

References

External links

 Heliconius ethilla in biolib

ethilla
Nymphalidae of South America
Butterflies described in 1819
Butterflies of Central America
Taxa named by Jean-Baptiste Godart